Christopher Heyerdahl (born September 18, 1963) is a Canadian actor who portrayed Alastair in Supernatural, the Wraith Todd in Stargate Atlantis, Sam in Van Helsing, "Swede" in Hell on Wheels, and Marcus in The Twilight Saga.

Early life and family
Heyerdahl was born in British Columbia, and is of Norwegian and Scottish descent.  His father emigrated from Norway to Canada in the 1950s. Thor Heyerdahl was his father's cousin.  Heyerdahl also speaks Norwegian and studied at the University of Oslo.

Career
Heyerdahl is primarily known for his recurring role as the enigmatic "Swede" in AMC's Hell on Wheels. This post-American Civil War drama debuted as the second highest rated original series in AMC history. He is also known for his role as Leonid in the Are You Afraid of the Dark? episode "The Thirteenth Floor" and as Nosferatu in the episode "Midnight Madness". He played the characters Halling and Wraith commander Todd in Stargate Atlantis, and Pallan in the Stargate SG-1 episode "Revisions". He played H. P. Lovecraft in the film Out of Mind: The Stories of H. P. Lovecraft (1998) and a punk, new at drug dealing, in Cadavres (2009).

He played the part of the demon Alastair in three episodes of Supernatural. He also played the part of Zor-El in the television series Smallville, as well as playing John Druitt and Bigfoot in the series Sanctuary. He played the part of Dieter Braun on True Blood during the show's 5th season.

His most notable film role was in the feature film New Moon, an adaptation of Stephenie Meyer's second book in her Twilight Saga. In this film, he played a vampire, Marcus, who is part of a powerful Italian family called the Volturi. He reprised that role in both parts of Breaking Dawn, the two-part adaptation of the fourth book in the Twilight Saga.

He has also performed on stage and was a member of the Young Company at the Stratford Festival in 1989 and 1990.

In 2015, Heyerdahl hosted the Leo Awards gala ceremony.

Filmography

Film

Television

Video games

Note and references

External links

 

1963 births
Living people
Male actors from British Columbia
Canadian male television actors
Canadian male film actors
Canadian male voice actors
Canadian people of Norwegian descent
Canadian people of Scottish descent